Albenis Antonio Rosales (born March 18, 1983) is a Venezuelan judoka, who played in the half-heavyweight category. He won a bronze medal for his division at the 2008 Pan American Judo Championships in Miami, Florida.

Rosales made his official debut for the 2008 Summer Olympics in Beijing, where he competed in the men's half-heavyweight class (100 kg). He lost his first preliminary match by an ippon and a tani otoshi (valley drop) to Olympic silver medalist Jang Sung-ho of South Korea.

References

External links

NBC Olympics Profile
 

Venezuelan male judoka
Living people
Olympic judoka of Venezuela
Judoka at the 2008 Summer Olympics
1983 births
20th-century Venezuelan people
21st-century Venezuelan people